Masquefa is a municipality in the comarca of the Anoia in Catalonia, Spain. It is situated on the edge of the Penedès Depression on the road between Piera and Martorell. It is served by a station on the FGC railway line R6 from Barcelona via Martorell to Igualada.

Demography

Subdivisions 
Five outlying villages are included within the municipality of Masquefa (populations as of 2005):
La Beguda Alta (171), on the municipal boundary with Sant Esteve Sesrovires, with a railway station
Can Parellada (1343), with a railway station
Can Quiseró (197)
Can Valls (99)
El Maset (778)

References

 Panareda Clopés, Josep Maria; Rios Calvet, Jaume; Rabella Vives, Josep Maria (1989); L. Luna (2007). Guia de Catalunya, Barcelona: Caixa de Catalunya.  (Spanish).  (Catalan).

External links 
Official website 
 Government data pages 
News and associations about Masquefa 

Municipalities in Anoia